In the performing arts, a stage mother is the mother of a child actor. The term stage mother sometimes has a negative connotation, suggesting that the individual is prone to obnoxiously demanding special treatment for her child, or suggesting that the individual has placed inappropriate pressure on her child to succeed, perhaps for reasons of vicariously living out her own dreams through the child. Entitled and grandiose demands have sometimes led to reportedly veiled threats from a stage parent.

Definition
A stage mother may also be the official manager of her child (e.g., Rose Thompson Hovick, Dina Lohan, Ethel Gumm, Debra McCurdy, Teri Shields, Susan Duff, Catherine Belkhodja, Tina Douglas, Tina Knowles, Katherine Jackson, etc.)—representing her child in negotiations for the professional services of her child. Such managers have often been referred to as "momagers" in the film industry.

In certain cases where a mother and child both work in the film industry, an automatic labeling of "stage mother" can be affixed to the mother without cause. Kathie Lee Gifford has been against the concept of stage mothers and had explained that when her son Cody co-starred with her in the film Model Behavior, it had been on his own volition to try acting and not at her insistence. Gifford plays a stage mother in that movie.

Stage fathers
Fathers have also been known to manage their children in this way, such as Joseph Jackson (patriarch of the Jackson family), Murry Wilson (father of three of The Beach Boys), Joe Simpson (father of Jessica and Ashlee Simpson), Jeff Archuleta (father of American Idol runner-up David Archuleta), Mathew Knowles (father of Beyoncé and Solange Knowles), Ira David Wood III (father of Evan Rachel Wood) and Kit Culkin (father of Macaulay and Kieran Culkin). A historical example of such a father was Leopold Mozart, who recognized his son's musical ability at an early age and made the most of it.

Abraham Quintanilla Jr., father of Tejano superstar Selena, is credited with having discovered Selena's gift of singing; he rounded up her and her siblings as a band (Selena y Los Dinos), named for his band in his younger days.

Stage fathers share a similar role with parents promoting their children in professional sports. The drive to enhance their child's success, and vicariously the father's own financial furtherance and fame can include implementation of strength and exercise regimens at a young age and  backhanded actions such as delaying enrollment in school so their sons will be bigger than their classmates. LaVar Ball, father of NBA player Lonzo Ball, achieved notoriety for spurious self aggrandizement and inflation of his son's assets, including questionable claims that his son's basketball skills exceeded those of Stephen Curry, LeBron James and Russell Westbrook.

Script mother 
A variant of the term has been a "script mother", or a woman writer who sees her children as a means for writing books or screenplays based on humiliating events in the child's life, to the detriment of the child, or exaggerating a child's personal problems. Script mothers can be writers, comedians or cartoonists (Comtesse de Ségur, Christine Angot, Maïwenn).

An example of a script mother has been Lynn Johnston, who has been criticized for exploiting her children (and husband) in her comic strip For Better or For Worse, as opposed to many cartoonists such as Charles Schultz and Berke Breathed who make up fictional characters. Johnston's children eventually had to be pulled out of school due to the constant bullying and embarrassment they received in being compared to their comic strip counterparts, and placed into a private school with tougher regulations on student conduct.

In popular culture
Real-life stage mothers and their children have been a popular subject for reality television shows, including the shows I Know My Kid's a Star (2008), Dance Moms (2011–2019), Toddlers & Tiaras (2008–2016) and its spinoff Here Comes Honey Boo Boo (2012–2014).

See also 

List of stage mothers
Child actor
Child beauty pageant
Helicopter parent
Kyōiku mama
Tennis dad

References

Women and the arts
Stereotypes of women
Motherhood